Electro (Maxwell "Max" Dillon) is a supervillain appearing in American comic books published by Marvel Comics. Created by Stan Lee and Steve Ditko, he was introduced in The Amazing Spider-Man #9 (Feb. 1964) as an adversary to the superhero Spider-Man. Electro has since endured as one of the web-slinger's most prominent foes, though he has also come into conflict with other heroes, most notably Daredevil. He is a founding member of the Sinister Six, and the leader of the original incarnation of the Emissaries of Evil, the first supervillain teams to oppose Spider-Man and Daredevil, respectively.

In the original version of the story, Max Dillon was a lineman for an electric company who turned to a life of crime after being struck by lightning while working on a power line and becoming a living electric capacitor. Electro's superpowers revolve around controlling electricity, which he can absorb to "charge" himself and become more powerful, gaining additional abilities such as flight and enhanced physical attributes. Since his conception, the character has undergone several design changes, from his original green and yellow costume, to his modern look with blue skin and a bald head.

During the time that Max Dillon was dead between 2016 and 2021, a second Electro named Francine Frye was introduced.

Outside of comics, Electro has been featured in various media adaptations of Spider-Man, including feature films, television series, and video games. Jamie Foxx portrayed the character in the live-action films The Amazing Spider-Man 2 (2014) by Marc Webb and Spider-Man: No Way Home  (2021), set in the Marvel Cinematic Universe.

Publication history

The Max Dillon incarnation of Electro was created by Stan Lee and Steve Ditko, and first appeared in The Amazing Spider-Man #9 (Feb. 1964). The character is also known as the member of the Frightful Four battling the Fantastic Four. He is also the first major Marvel villain to be written in publication history as battling Daredevil, even being the founder and leader of the supervillain team that oppose him, the Emissaries of Evil.

The second incarnation of Electro, Francine Frye, was created by Dan Slott and Humberto Ramos, and first appeared in The Amazing Spider-Man vol. 3 #2 (July 2014), though she did not become Electro until The Amazing Spider-Man vol. 4 #17 (October 2016).

Fictional character biography

Maxwell Dillon

While Maxwell "Max" Dillon, an electrical engineer and lineman, is repairing a power line, a freak lightning accident causes a mutagenic change that transforms him into a living electrical capacitor. His powers are initially weak, so he spends some time stealing electrical equipment from Stark Industries to charge himself. During this time, he is approached by Magneto, who considers him a potential recruit for his Brotherhood of Evil Mutants, claiming that Dillon's power rival his own, but Dillon refuses. The following day, Dillon is confronted by a small-time thug from whom he was borrowing money to pay for the machinery he needed. When the thug draws a gun on him because he did not paid back the money yet, he responds by shooting a blast of lightning through the thug's chest—the first time Dillon ever kills anybody.

Soon taking the name "Electro", he turns to a life of a professional crime, his first victim being J. Jonah Jameson. Electro breaks into the Daily Bugle Building and steals from Jameson's safe right in front of him. Jameson accuses Spider-Man of being an alternate identity of Electro, prompting Spider-Man to prove the publisher wrong. During their first ever confrontation, Spider-Man is nearly killed after touching the electrically charged villain. Spider-Man eventually uses a fire hose to short-circuit Electro while wearing rubber gloves to protect himself.

Electro next confronts Daredevil for the first time when trying to break into the Baxter Building. He is again defeated. Electro later joins the original Sinister Six led by Doctor Octopus, and is the first member of the group to fight Spider-Man, battling him at a Stark plant. Spider-Man enters the fight believing he lost his powers, however after dodging a bolt of electricity from Electro he realizes his powers returned. Electro loses his power when the power is cut off by Spider-Man, who gets a card from him that leads him to fight Kraven the Hunter. Electro attacks the Fantastic Four at the wedding of Sue Storm and Reed Richards, under the influence of Doctor Doom's mind-control machine, but he has no memory of this due to the actions of Mister Fantastic. He later recruits the Emissaries of Evil in a plot of revenge against Daredevil for previous defeats. This group consists of Gladiator, Stilt-Man, Leap-Frog, and the Matador.

Electro is later hired by J. Jonah Jameson to defeat Spider-Man on national television. He encounters Daredevil again in San Francisco, at which time he temporarily dons a modified costume. He then takes control of a Protarian android seeking the destruction of Omega. Electro then teams with Blizzard against Spider-Man and Daredevil. Electro then attempts to aid a band of criminals escaping the Defenders. Electro later joins the Frightful Four. As part of the Frightful Four, he uses Spider-Man as bait to trap the Fantastic Four. Subsequently, he battles the Falcon but is defeated, partly because he does not consider the Falcon to be a serious threat. Electro later learns that he can electro-statically disrupt Spider-Man's wall-crawling ability. Chameleon and Hammerhead then send the Shocker to try to recruit Electro into their organization. Instead, he later accepts Doctor Octopus' invitation to rejoin the Sinister Six, and battles Spider-Man.

Electro fights Spider-Man countless times, either on his own or as part of a group such as the Sinister Six. He also fights such other heroes as Daredevil, the Fantastic Four, and the New Avengers. Despite his immense power, he almost always is defeated, usually as a result of his foes outsmarting him or taking advantage of his weakness to water while charged. As a result of his frequent and often embarrassing defeats, Electro tries to take over New York City's power supply in an attempt at glory and respect. Spider-Man thwarts this plan, however, and convinces Electro to quit his criminal career. When Kaine (Spider-Man's insane clone) starts killing enemies of Spider-Man, Electro begins to fear for his life and temporarily joins Hobgoblin's(Jason Macendale) Sinister Seven, which were formed to combat Kaine. This group os quickly disbanded, and following Kaine's subsequent disappearance, Electro returns to retirement.

This changes when the Rose agrees to fund an experimental technique that can amplify Electro's abilities, in exchange for Electro's services as an enforcer. Seeing this as a chance to rise above the string of failures that made up so much of his life, Electro undergoes the procedure. After paying off his debt to the Rose by defeating several members of The True Believers (an offshoot of the ninja sect called the Hand), a group of ninja assassins who was interfering in the Rose's operations, Electro attempts to demonstrate his newly amplified powers to the world, once again attempting to take control of New York City's power supply. Wearing an insulated suit, Spider-Man stops him. Electro, in an effort to make a final grand gesture, throws himself into the Hudson River while his body is highly charged, seemingly killing himself in an explosion.

Somehow surviving, Electro resurfaces later as part of the re-formed Sinister Six, formed to kill Senator Stewart Ward and Doctor Octopus (whom the other members of the Six hate due to his arrogance). His powers seemingly reverted to their pre-amplification level, and he wears a new blue-and-white costume. When Venom betrays his fellow Sinister Six members, attempting to kill them one by one, he attacks Electro and leaves him for dead. Once again, Electro survives, and returns to his yellow-and green-costume. Electro is working with the Vulture when they are attacked by Spider-Man, who thinks they kidnapped his Aunt May. Electro manages to bring Spider-Man to the edge of defeat, using his powers in more intelligent ways and blowing up a large number of cars, including some with children in them. After a devastating battle, Spider-Man defeats him by fighting him to a gas refinery. The badly wounded Electro recovers and shortly afterwards joins the Sinister Twelve, assembled by the Green Goblin, though he and the rest of the team os defeated thanks to the intervention of the Fantastic Four, Daredevil, Captain America, Iron Man and Yellowjacket.

Later, separately, he is hired by the Skrull Pagon (posing as Elektra) to free Karl Lykos (also known as Sauron) from The Raft, a maximum-security prison for supervillains. After causing a riot, Electro tries to run away with his waitress girlfriend, but is captured by the New Avengers, subsequently fainting when faced with the prospect of being beaten up by Luke Cage, using Spider-Man's webbing to protect himself from Electro. Later, Electro joins Chameleon's "Exterminators", seeking to take advantage of Peter Parker and his loved ones. During the "Civil War" storyline, Electro is among the villains in Hammerhead's unnamed villain army when Iron Man and S.H.I.E.L.D. raid the hideout. In "Secret Invasion," Electro appears as member of Hood's crime syndicate and attacks a Skrull force. After the Skrull posing as Edwin Jarvis kidnaps the baby of Luke Cage and Jessica Jones, the Avengers and the Fantastic Four begin going after everyone who is associated with the Skrulls. Because of this, Electro is confronted by Wolverine in an alley where, after a battle, he leaves Dillon beaten and unconscious.

Electro returns in issue 612 starting The Gauntlet, with a new look as his face is now scarred with lightning bolts and sporting a trench coat. The revamp was explained by writer Mark Waid, stating that artist Paul Azaceta "tweaked the design a bit, adding some burn scars to reflect Electro's current situation. As Electro gets older, as his body chemistry starts to shift into middle age, his powers are becoming more erratic and less easy for him to control. So he turns to a surprise Marvel villain – someone rarely, if ever, seen in the pages of Amazing – to level up." During his appearance in "The Gauntlet", it is revealed that Electro has lost control over his powers: besides the physical disfigurement, his touch is now 100% lethal. Depressed and angry at the world because of this, Electro begins gathering other outcasts and misfits into a group known as "Power To The People", which targets right-wing newspaper baron Dexter Bennett and the New York Stock Exchange in the wake of the 2008 Financial Crisis. Electro's group manages to gain positive coverage in the media, hampering Spider-Man's ability to convince Electro's followers of his true evil nature.

Electro's duplicitous nature causes him to betray his followers to align with the amoral Bennett in exchange for help finding a way to restore his powers to a controllable level. The Mad Thinker is able to come up with a process to cure Electro, but Spider-Man interferes with the process, turning Electro into an artificial electrical thunderbolt. Furious, Electro double-crosses Bennett and ultimately uses his new powers to destroy The DB building, crippling Bennett in the process. In doing so, Electro uses up so much of his newfound power that Spider-Man is able to neutralize him with his webbing. In the epilogue, Electro runs into Sasha Kravinoff and Chameleon in his new jail cell. In the following issue involving Sandman, it is revealed that Electro has escaped. Under the orders of the Kravinoffs, he breaks the fourth Vulture out of prison.

During the "Heroic Age" storyline, it is suspected by the Young Allies that Electro had a discarded and disavowed daughter named Aftershock (similar to the MC2 Universe version) who is a member of the Bastards of Evil. When Young Allies members Firestar and Gravity fight Electro, he defeats them and lets them live so that they can spread the message that he does not endorse Aftershock and the Bastards of Evil's terrorism. He also says they can look up how and when he got his powers on the internet and there was no way a girl of Aftershock's age could have been conceived after he got his powers: It is impossible for him to be Aftershock's father. Electro is later present at the scene where Mattie Franklin is sacrificed by Sasha Kravinoff as part of a ritual that resurrects Vladimir Kravinoff as a large humanoid lion creature.

During the "Origin of the Species" storyline, Electro is among the supervillains invited by Doctor Octopus to reestablish the Sinister Six, where they are promised that they will receive a reward in exchange for securing some specific items. Electro goes after Spider-Man for Menace's infant. Anticipating Spider-Man's plan to deliver the infant to a hospital, Electro waits at the nearest hospital in Spider-Man's area until Spider-Man shows up. The two begin to battle until Sandman interferes and Spider-Man tricks Electro into electrocuting Sandman, turning him into glass. Flying shards of glass hit Electro, temporarily stunning him and allowing Spider-Man to escape. Spider-Man goes on an angry rampage against all the villains after the Chameleon tricks him into thinking the infant is dead. He defeats Electro in Vinegar Hill, Brooklyn.

In the Big Time storyline, Electro becomes a member of Doctor Octopus' new Sinister Six and helps Chameleon break into an air force base in New Jersey. Electro was with the Sinister Six when it came to fighting Intelligencia. During a conflict between the Intelligencia and the Sinister Six, Mad Thinker was able to briefly deactivate Electro's powers, but was caught off-guard when Electro physically attacked him instead, the surprise of the attack allowed Electro to defeat Mad Thinker. During the "'Ends of the Earth" storyline despite the Sinister Six being prepared for a fight with the Avengers, Electro was the first of the team to be defeated, being hurled into the upper atmosphere by Thor while distracted by his inability to attack Spider-Man's new hi-tech armor.

Electro returns to Earth and attempts to avenge himself on Thor by forcing an A.I.M. scientist to convert him to generate protons instead of electrons, but he is defeated when Superior Spider-Man (Doctor Octopus' mind in Spider-Man's body) manages to convert him into a stream of protons and traps him. Superior Spider-Man places Electro in containment next to Sandman in his hidden underwater lab. Electro, Chameleon, Sandman, Mysterion, and the Vulture are later seen as part of a team led by Superior Spider-Man called the "Superior Six". Superior Spider-Man has been temporarily controlling their minds to redeem them for their crimes. He does this by forcing them to do heroic deeds against their will, some of which almost get them killed. Every time he is done controlling them, he puts them back in their containment cells. They eventually break free of Superior Spider-Man's control and attempt to exact revenge on the wall-crawler, nearly destroying New York to do so. With the help of Sun Girl, Superior Spider-Man is barely able to stop the Superior Six. Electro is later seen battling the Punisher in Los Angeles.

Sometime after Spider-Man regains his body, Electro comes into the Bar With No Name and is introduced to the Hobgoblin's servants by his friend and bartender, Deke. The villains start joking about the gloomy Electro. One mentions how Thor launched him into space, another about how "Spider-Man" made him part of the Superior Six, and yet another about how Electro was taken out by the Punisher, despite the latter's lack of powers. Electro gets angry and starts sparking, but the bartender gets the situation under control by commenting on how bad the Punisher is and with compliments like breaking so many villains out of the Raft, which earned him the respect of Crossbones and Count Nefaria. This does not stop the others, however. Determined to get respect, Electro heads back over to the Raft, ready for another breakout despite the Green Goblin having done the same just recently and the fact that it was re-christened as Spider-Island II. Electro sends a blot of electricity around, but it grows excessively big and he cannot turn it off. He finally exhausts all of his power but when this happens, he passes out and many of the villains he tried to break out are now dead. Vowing revenge, Electro soon realizes what caused this to happen to him: experiments conducted by "Spider-Man".

Electro later visits his friend, Francine Frye, and keeps his distance because of his uncontrollable powers. Francine starts to kiss Electro, only to end up dying from electrocution. At Peter Parker's behest, Parker Industries is testing out an anti-Electro netting that can capture Electro. Electro is later seen with Black Cat when they raid Eel's hideout where Electro defeats Eel. Electro and Black Cat later crash the meeting between Mister Negative and Phil Urich (who is leading the remnants of the Goblin Underground as the self-proclaimed Goblin King) where they throw Eel's body into the area where the meeting is. During Peter Parker's interview on the Fact Channel, Electro attacks the security team on the channel and the Black Cat arrives, announcing her demand that if Spider-Man does not show up in 15 minutes, Peter Parker will be dead. Electro complains about the plan but Black Cat stays determined that Spider-Man will show up, but then Silk arrives to confront them both, giving Peter the time to change into Spider-Man and jump into action, aiding Silk. As she battles against Electro and Spider-Man deals with Black Cat, J. Jonah Jameson remains on the channel forcing the cameraman to film the action. Electro fails to stop Silk, but the Black Cat redirects one of Electro's bolts into hitting Spider-Man, knocking him down in the process.

Electro pressures Sajani into telling him how effective the anti-Electro traps will be in removing his powers, but the Black Cat interrupts their talk to ask her how the device works. They both infiltrate the demonstration, suiting Electro into the "Fake Electro" costume while Black Cat disguises herself as one of the operators. Black Cat starts the machine, further enhancing Electro's power, only to be interrupted by Spider-Man and Silk. Electro tries to escape but his insulated webbing protects him by allowing Silk to cover Electro with her webbing. Black Cat changes the plan, using the wiring to overload Electro by putting his powers way out of control, shooting his lightning bolts against the helicopter. Silk saves the helicopter and Spider-Man jumps into the machine, using his webbing to cover Electro to take him out of there. Electro asks to let go, but Spider-Man remains determined to hold him until they are both saved by Silk who pulls them out of the machine and away from the explosion which failed to kill Spider-Man as Black Cat wanted and she escapes. However, Electro was apparently de-powered and taken into custody.

As part of the "All-New, All-Different Marvel", a de-powered Max Dillon is shown as an inmate at Andry Corrections Facility alongside Lizard. Upon being sprung out of the prison by Rhino, he meets a mysterious red-suited man who offers to restore Electro's powers in exchange for his services. Jackal and Lizard work on the procedure that would re-power Maxwell Dillon. When Dillon was reluctant to go through with the procedure, Jackal brings in a woman who Dillon recognizes as Francine Frye minus the piercings and tattoos that are on her body. Dillon agrees to go ahead with the procedure. The Jackal cloned Francine from DNA taken from her charred cheek. Francine observes the Jackal's attempt to restore Dillon's powers, but the experiment fails, charging his suit but not his body. Unexpectedly, the DNA in Dillon's saliva that was mixed in with Francine's own DNA attracts the electrical energy to Francine. Desiring more, Francine leans in to kiss Dillon and kills him in the process while absorbing his powers as the resulting action burns Dillon's body.

Upon building a special machine, Doctor Octopus resurrects Electro with his powers intact as Kindred comments on Electro's abilities while stating that Doctor Octopus is getting closer to his true self. Doctor Octopus and Electro find Kraven the Hunter in the Savage Land hunting a dinosaur. Electro shocks the dinosaur as Doctor Octopus is instructed by Kindred to entice Kraven the Hunter by quoting "The best way to entice your fourth recruit is to offer him your fifth".

Francine Frye

Debuting in The Amazing Spider-Man vol. 3 #2 (July 2014) Francine Frye is a woman who is a fan of supervillains. At some point, she befriended Electro. At the time when Electro was losing control of his abilities, she was visited by him. When attempting to kiss Electro, Francine died from electrocution. Jackal later revived her as a clone, lacking her piercings and tattoos. She was summoned by the new Jackal to help persuade Electro to go through with the procedure that would repower him. It turned out that Electro's saliva was mixed in with Francine's DNA, which led to her kissing Dillon enough to kill him and becoming the second Electro. She later encountered Prowler, at the time when he infiltrated New U Technologies. During the chase, Electro accidentally caused the apparent death of Prowler causing Jackal to make a clone of him.

During the "Dead No More: The Clone Conspiracy" storyline, Francine assists Rhino in attacking Spider-Man when he infiltrates New U Technologies. Both of them are defeated. When Prowler has not returned from his mission to Alcatraz, the villains he cloned start fighting again enough for Jackal to send Francine to have Madame Web's clone find Prowler. Francine shocks the answers out of Madame Web's clone as Julia Carpenter feels it on her end. After Julia Carpenter escapes, Francine confronts Prowler as his body starts failing. Prowler tries to escape Francine's wrath in Alcatraz, which proves difficult with her powers and his dying body. Using his weapons, the gift shop, and his strategic thinking, Prowler manages to defeat the simple-minded Francine.

When Jackal's police contact Chief Anderson tells him about where the clone of Gwen Stacy is, Jackal sends Rhino and Electro to Horizon University. When they retrieve the Gwen Stacy clone, she tells them to bring Kaine due to his encounter with the Carrion virus that might help in Jackal's research. Anna Marie Marconi persuades them to bring her along too since she also studied Kaine and the drug. Both villains agree to the terms. Electro later assists Doctor Octopus into fighting Spectro, following his failed attempt to make off with a test subject, where she is able to knock him out.

Alongside Kaine, Electro was being studied by Doctor Octopus to find out how to perfect the "Proto Clone". When Spider-Woman of Earth-65 tries to free Kaine, she is attacked by Electro. When Spider-Woman of Earth-65 leaves Prowler in an alley when he proves too weak to continue, he is found by Electro. Julia Carpenter arrives and fends Electro off as she tells Prowler that Spider-Man has stabilized the human and clone cells. When Electro gets the upper hand on Julia, Prowler sacrifices himself to stop Electro and dies in Julia's arms. Electro is one of the few clones that was able to survive the inverse frequency and got away.

Electro later appears as a member of the Sinister Six (consisting of Hobgoblin, Bombshell, Spot and Sandman) led by Aaron Davis in a recolored Iron Spider armor. She accompanied them in their mission to steal a decommissioned S.H.I.E.L.D. Helicarrier. During the "Hunted" storyline, Electro was seen as a patron at the Pop-Up with No Name. Mayor Wilson Fisk's operatives later freed Electro and she was recruited to join an all-female incarnation of the Sinister Syndicate. When Francine recaps to Janice how she got her powers, she learns that Janice is Tombstone's daughter. After meeting its members, Electro was reluctant to join with them until she hears from Janice that their first mission given to them by Mayor Wilson Fisk to target Boomerang. This is enough to convince Electro to join as she asks them to put her down for two vegan cheeseburgers. The Sinister Syndicate begins their mission where they attack the F.E.A.S.T. building that Boomerang is volunteering at.

Boomerang tries to reason with Beetle and Electro who are still mad at him for betraying him. After getting Aunt May to safety, Peter Parker changes into Spider-Man and helps Boomerang fight the Syndicate. The Syndicate starts doing their formation until Spider-Man accidentally sets off Boomerang's gaserang which knocks out Spider-Man enough for the Syndicate to make off with Boomerang. As Beetle has Electro write a proposal on how the Syndicate can use Boomerang as an example to the criminal underworld, Beetle leave while calling Wilson Fisk that they caught Boomerang as she is given the information on where the exchange can happen.

When Beetle returns to the headquarters, Electro is present when Mayor Wilson Fisk brings the full force of New York City to their headquarters demanding that they surrender Boomerang to him. When Spider-Man arrives to reason with Mayor Fisk, Electro claims that Spider-Man is buying them some time. The Syndicate then assists Spider-Man against Mayor Fisk's forces. After Spider-Man evacuates Boomerang, the Syndicate fights Mayor Fisk's forces while not killing them. The Syndicate is defeated and arrested by the police. Their transport is then attacked by an unknown assailant who frees them.

During the "Sinister War" storyline, Electro is with the Sinister Syndicate when they discuss adding Ana Kravinoff to their ranks until they are abducted by Kindred's giant centipedes. Kindred offers them and the other villains the opportunity to take down Spider-Man and punish him for his sins. Electro and the rest of the Sinister Syndicate intercept Overdrive who is carrying Spider-Man away from Foreigner's group.

During the "Devil's Reign" storyline, Electro is among the characters that Mayor Wilson Fisk recruited to be part of his Thunderbolts units so that they can help the NYPD crack down on superhuman vigilantism. She assists Agony, Rhino, and U.S. Agent in taking down Moon Knight.

Powers and abilities
An unusually configured magnetic field is created when Max Dillon is struck by lightning while holding live, high-tension wires and a wound reel of one-inch cable, granting him superhuman powers. Electro can generate massive quantities of electricity, up to approximately 100,000 volts. He can employ this electrostatic energy as lightning arcs from his fingertips, and his maximum charge is more than enough to kill a normal human. When his body is charged to high levels, he becomes superhumanly strong and fast. He can also glide over power lines by using the electricity contained therein for propulsion, and he has on occasion been shown to actually ride on lightning bolts.

During a stint in prison, Doctor Octopus gave him the ideas of ionizing metals and sparking the petroleum in the fuel tanks of vehicles as a way to generate explosions. He can charge himself up to make himself more powerful. He can also absorb the energy of electrical equipment such as a power plant to increase his powers further. In New Avengers, he was shown to fly and manipulate large amounts of electricity and machinery, when he freed all the prisoners at Ryker's Island.

An experimental procedure heightens his powers, allowing Electro to store and absorb a seemingly limitless amount of electricity. He also seems to gain the power over magnetism to a certain degree, allowing him to manipulate magnetic fields and move objects in a manner similar to that of Magneto, and can overcome his old weakness to water by using the electromagnetic fields around him to vaporize water before it can touch him. He makes Spider-Man beg by stimulating the bioelectric currents in his brain, and is able to defeat Nate Grey by manipulating said currents in Nate's brain to turn his own psionic powers against him.

Electro can override any electrically powered device and manipulate it according to his mental commands. By using an external electrical power source to recharge his body's energy reserves, Electro can expend electricity indefinitely without diminishing his personal reserves. When he is fully charged, Electro is extremely sensitive to anything that may "short circuit" him, such as water. Electro propels himself along magnetic lines of force in objects that have great electrical potential, such as high-tension electrical lines. He can also create electrostatic bridges to traverse upon, at the cost of a great expenditure of energy.

During the events of the storyline "The Gauntlet", Electro becomes a living artificial thunderbolt, allowing him to travel through electrical appliances such as going through a light bulb and exiting through any other electronic device connected to the power source. He is also able to transmit himself over Spider-Man's web line.

Reception
During an interview with Newsarama about The Gauntlet and Grim Hunt, Mark Waid claimed that the character of Electro is "one of the smart criminals who was saving what he's been stealing from banks and savings and loans". He also described Electro as the "anti-bailout guy".

A Comics Bulletin review published by Ray Tate of Young Allies #2 described Electro's appearance in that issue as "a punk with a gimmick". He also claimed that the character "never harbored a pathological hatred of Spider-Man", and that he instead "developed a healthy loathing for Spidey because the Wall Crawler frequently interfered with his sole goal of larceny". Ray believes that Electro "isn't a wanton psychopath", but a "bank robber with electrical powers", and that he is "not nuts" but "a felon". These remarks show that Electro's character is received not as being mentally ill, but simply a thieving villain.

In 2009, Electro was ranked as IGN's 87th Greatest Comic Book Villain of All Time.

In 2022, Screen Rant ranked Electro 6th in their "10 Most Powerful Silk Villains In Marvel Comics" list.

In 2022, Screen Rant ranked Electro 5th in their "10 Most Powerful Silk Villains In Marvel Comics" list.

Other versions

House of M
In the House of M reality, Electro is one of Rhino's friends (along with Vulture and Ox) who helped him attack and detain the Green Goblin for ruining the best chance at a good life Rhino ever had.

Marvel 1602
In Marvel 1602, Electro is a member of the Sinister Sextet, the dimension's Sinister Six. The Web Warriors (alternate versions of Spider-Man) visited the 1602 Universe to deal with the Sinister Sextet. After apprehending the villains, they noticed the dimension's Electro has escaped, unbeknownst to the heroes, followed them back to the Great Web.

Marvel 2099
When Miguel O'Hara finds himself in an alternate version of 2099 after being trapped in the past, he encounters a 2099 version of the Sinister Six, which includes an android that calls itself 'Electro' after it gained sentience and electromagnetic powers in a lightning strike. After the battle against the rebels led by Spider-Man, concluded with the death of the former leader of the Sinister Six, Goblin 2099 (who was actually Father Jennifer D'Angelo, an undercover member of the resistance), Electro and the other members of the Sinister Six are recruited by Venture as members of the terrorist organization the Fist in the year 2016.

Electro is later sent to bring defector Sonny Frisco back to the Fist's base. It follows him through Parker Industries and, defeating Captain America along the way, almost kills Sonny before Spider-Man captures Electro using wooden shields to deny its power. It is then taken and imprisoned in Miguel's private laboratory, where Electro is led to believe that Lyla, Miguel's holographic assistant, freed it and joined its crusade to start a robotic revolution. After revealing the date of the Fist's attack in New York, the simulation ends and Lyla disables Electro.

Marvel Noir
The Marvel Noir version of Electro is introduced in the first issue of Spider-Man Noir (2020). Unlike his Earth-616 counterpart, this version of Electro is stocky and muscular with a thick mustache, and his namesake, however, comes from a circular pattern of dense Tesla coils strapped to his back. He also wields a lightning rod like a lightsaber, with blinding bolts of electricity coursing through both it and the aforementioned Tesla coils. Electro is first seen attacking Peter Parker at his aunt's house, but he is clocked out by Mary Jane Watson and forced to retreat. Electro is later shown fighting Spider-Man at the Neues Museum in Berlin (where he had previously killed Dr. Heinrich Hellstrom), but flees to retreat when Byron Ironsides throws a pack of explosives at him. Electro then proceedes to Istanbul, where he drains the power from half of the city.

As he and his employer Huma Bergmann reach the Temple of Inanna in Uruk, Babylon, the proximity to the M'kraan Crystal inside affects Electro, causing him to increase in size and strength while his features become progressively more deformed. Inside the Temple, he confronts Spider-Man and Hu-Ri, throwing her and the Cicada Stone at the door to the Tomb of Heaven. The door opens a gateway to the Underworld, which causes both Electro and Spider-Man to fall into the Underworld itself. There, Electro is restored to his normal self, but is eaten whole by Ereshkigal, the Queen of the Underworld.

Marvel Zombies Return
In Marvel Zombies Return, Electro appears as a member of the Sinister Six that battles the reality-jumping zombie Spider-Man. When the zombified Spider-Man is behind him, he was bitten on the hand. Then Electro becomes headless and infected, later helping his fellow members devour Peter Parker's friends. Angered and devastated, the zombie Spider-Man then obliterates his body for what he and the team has done when his arm is snapped off and Spider-Man uses his powers against him.

MC2
In the MC2 alternate future, Electro has a daughter, Allison Dillon, who is emotionally troubled over never having had a stable father-figure in her life and becomes the supervillain Aftershock. She had inherited her father's powers, but because Dillon and Allison's electrical auras are different, the slightest touch causes them intense pain. When Dillon discovers his daughter is following in his footsteps, he asks Spider-Man for help. Spider-Man, Spider-Girl, and the Avengers help subdue Aftershock. When Dillon shows up, father and daughter vow to overcome their pain, and Max promises to be a better father.

Old Man Logan
On Earth-807128, an area of Amerika called Electroville was named after Electro after the villains eliminated the superheroes.

In the pages of "Old Man Logan" that took place on Earth-21923, Electro was among the villains that came together to eliminate every superhero. He accompanied Enchantress in fighting She-Hulk, Daredevil, and Moon Knight in Manhattan. Electro shocked Moon Knight into unconsciousness before being shot in the head by Punisher. Kraven the Hunter later stabbed Punisher in the back and avenged Electro. The part with an area being called Electroville remains intact.

Spider-Man: Reign
In the Spider-Man: Reign reality, Electro is one of the villains released by Edward to destroy Spider-Man; he is killed by Spider-Man after being knocked into Hydro-Man (who also dies) causing him to short circuit.

Spider-Man: The Manga
In Spider-Man: The Manga, Electro is Shiraishi, a mechanic who falls into massive debt after he accidentally hits a child with his car, leaving the boy permanently disabled. Desperate for money, Shiraishi takes on a number of odd jobs (the last of which he robs) before being contacted by the handicapped boy's father, a professor researching high-voltage emission technology. Shiraishi agrees to be a test subject for the professor's experiments, and is given superhuman abilities through "electrification devices" he is implanted with. The professor convinces Shiraishi, who is dubbed "Electro" by the media, to use his electrokinesis to rob banks, but the professor begins to have second thoughts when Shiraishi's greed proves insatiable, and he begins to murder people who get in his way.

While robbing a department store, due to the banks now being too heavily guarded, Electro is challenged by the new hero Spider-Man. During his battle with Spider-Man, Electro accidentally kills the professor, the only person who knows how to remove his powers, which leave him unable to touch any living thing without shocking them. The distraught and enraged Electro is then fatally punched by Spider-Man, and before dying explains his origin, and has his mask removed to reveal that he is the missing brother of Spider-Man's friend, Rumiko, who Spider-Man was trying to get money for by claiming the reward offered to anyone who could defeat Electro.

Spider-Verse
A version of Electro is a member of the Six Men of Sinestry of the dimension Earth-803. He caused a blackout to enable the group to execute their move in stealing the mayor's plan and after a battle with Lady Spider, was forced to retreat after they were overwhelmed yet they were able to accomplish their mission.

This Electro went on to start a chain of events that led to an army of Electros attempting to traverse the multiverse in opposition to the Spider-Army, led by a Max Dillon from a world where he used his command of electricity to become a major world leader. This Electro attempted to control the others by transforming himself into an electricity-based life-form, absorbing the power of one in ten of the other Electros gathered by his army, while using assorted dimensionally displaced Doctor Octopuses as his 'think tank'. However, the Spider-Army were eventually able to trick the Electros into attacking them in Earth-803 – a 'steampunk' Earth with no available electricity for them to draw on – and containing them in a vast Farraday cage made of specially treated webbing.

Ultimate Marvel

The Ultimate Marvel incarnation of Electro has been reimagined with powers as a product of bioengineering. Unlike his mainstream counterpart, this version is bald, wears a black leather outfit and has some grotesque burn scars. As a result of experimentation by Justin Hammer, Max Dillon is given the power to control and create electricity. He is sold by Hammer to the Kingpin in exchange for a real estate development contract. When Spider-Man breaks into Kingpin's office, Electro electrocutes him and he, the Enforcers, and Kingpin unmask him, revealing him to be a teenager. They decide to throw him out a window, but Spider-Man returns and defeats him.

Three weeks later, Electro wakes from his coma and escapes from federal custody, murdering several people in the process. The Ultimates members Captain America, Iron Man, and Black Widow arrive and re-apprehend him wanting to ask how he illegally tampered with his genetic structure. Electro is placed in S.H.I.E.L.D. custody along with Sandman, Doctor Octopus and Norman Osborn as Nick Fury states that they have been detained for illegally tampering with their genetic structures. Electro and the other villains meet Kraven the Hunter after he had been apprehended for the same illegal genetic structure tampering he did. The five supervillains escape and become the Ultimate Six. They attack S.H.I.E.L.D. and manage to capture Spider-Man. They tie him to a chair, torture and humiliate him, and force him to join them. In a battle with the Ultimates on the White House lawn, Thor defeats Electro. While incarcerated, Electro claims to the people guarding him that he was biding his time to attack Osborn.

Electro eventually escapes and is hired by Bolivar Trask to gauge Venom's power. Electro leads Venom on a chase throughout Manhattan when Spider-Man appears. Electro knocks Spider-Man out and tries to kill him, but Venom attacks Electro, trying to take Electro's opportunity to kill the fallen hero. Venom defeats Electro by destroying the neon signs that Electro is feeding on. When S.H.I.E.L.D. arrives Venom flees, and Electro is once again brought into S.H.I.E.L.D. custody. The Green Goblin later breaks Electro out of the supervillain prison within the Ultimates' headquarters, the Triskelion, in exchange for Electro's alliance when needed. Electro goes to Osborn's penthouse to wait for instructions where he is disturbed by Spider-Man. He attempts to flee and gets involved in a fight both with Spider-Man and S.H.I.E.L.D. agents. He is eventually brought down and is assumed to be back in custody.

Alongside the rest of the Ultimate Six who are now joined by Vulture, Electro plays a role in the "Death of Spider-Man" storyline. Norman breaks him and the rest out of the Triskelion and wishes for them to kill Peter Parker. After Doctor Octopus tries to leave the group and is killed by Green Goblin, the remaining five (Electro, Green Goblin, Sandman, Kraven and Vulture) go to Parker's home in Queens. There a fight ensues between the Five and both Johnny Storm and Bobby Drake. The two heroes are defeated, with Electro himself defeating Iceman by sending a jolt of electricity through his ice, but not before Johnny manages to knock Osborn out. Peter then arrives, wearing his Spider-Man costume but no mask, and proceeds to fight the four remaining members. After a pitched battle, Electro is about to deliver the killing shot on the beaten and exhausted Peter. But before he can strike, Electro is shot three times from behind by Aunt May. He 'short circuits' in a massive electrical surge, taking out Kraven, Sandman and Vulture.

Later, Electro is shown to have survived the shooting, and is being held in S.H.I.E.L.D. custody. Electro is able to power up and attempt an escape after being improperly sedated by a S.H.I.E.L.D. nurse. After taking down the Ultimates, Electro fights Nick Fury and the new Spider-Man (Miles Morales), thinking Miles is the original and angry that he is still alive. Morales stuns Electro by hitting him with a hurled crate, then Fury shoots him to end the threat. Electro later resurfaces, fighting Sabretooth over something relating to Norman Osborn. The two are broken up and defeated by Miles, with help from Cloak and Dagger.

In other media

Television

 The Max Dillon incarnation of Electro makes a cameo appearance in The Marvel Super Heroes episode "Dr. Doom's Day".
 The Max Dillon incarnation of Electro appears in Spider-Man (1967), voiced by Tom Harvey.
 The Max Dillon incarnation of Electro appears in Spider-Man and His Amazing Friends, voiced by Allan Melvin.
 A variation of Electro appears in Spider-Man: The Animated Series series five-part episode "Six Forgotten Warriors", voiced by Philip Proctor. This version is Rheinholt Schmidt, a German Nazi who masqueraded as Russian police chief Rheinholt Kragov for most of his life while searching for and impersonating his father, the Red Skull, in an attempt to gain control of his doomsday device. Once Spider-Man, the Kingpin, and the Insidious Six retrieve the keys and box needed to access it, Rheinholt traps them except for his step-brother, the Chameleon, who betrays the Kingpin to help Rheinholt access the doomsday device and free the Red Skull from his energy vortex prison. The Red Skull subsequently uses the weapon on Rheinholt, turning him into Electro, but the latter turns on him for risking his life. Rheinholt tries to take over the world for himself, but Spider-Man tricks him into trapping himself in the energy vortex before destroying the machine.
 A Counter-Earth version of Electro appears in the Spider-Man Unlimited episode "Ill-Met By Moonlight", voiced by Dale Wilson. This version is a Bestial electric eel and guard for the High Evolutionary.
 The Max Dillon incarnation of Electro appears in Spider-Man: The New Animated Series voiced by Ethan Embry. This version is a geeky teenager and Peter Parker's friend who attends Empire State University before gaining electrical powers after being covered in an unknown substance and struck by lightning.
 The Max Dillon incarnation of Electro appears in The Spectacular Spider-Man, voiced by Crispin Freeman. Introduced in the episode "Interactions", this version is transformed into a living electric capacitor following a freak accident involving genetically altered electric rays and eels. Afterwards, he is placed in an insulated body suit to contain the bio-electricity his body now produces and attempts to lead a normal life again until Spider-Man mistakes him for a supervillain and Electro turns to crime. Following this, Electro would go on to battle Spider-Man on several occasions and join two incarnations of the Sinister Six until he is eventually defeated and arrested.
 The Max Dillon incarnation of Electro appears in Ultimate Spider-Man, voiced by Christopher Daniel Barnes. This version is an old enemy of Spider-Man, who views him as incompetent, until the former accidentally throws Electro into a large screen in Times Square during a battle, which transforms him into a hyper-electrified form. Following this, Electro would go on to battle Spider-Man and his fellow S.H.I.E.L.D. trainees several times, join three incarnations of the Sinister Six, and become temporarily trapped in the Siege Perilous by the Green Goblin, who uses him to travel the multiverse.
 The Francine Frye incarnation of Electro appears in Spider-Man (2017), voiced by Daisy Lightfoot. This version is an African-American teenager who uses an exoskeleton that grants her electrical powers, which she needs to constantly recharge.
 The Max Dillon incarnation of Electro appears in Marvel Super Hero Adventures, voiced by Ian James Corlett.
 The Francine Frye incarnation of Electro appears in Spidey and His Amazing Friends, voiced by Stephanie Lemelin.

Film

 Electro appears in James Cameron's aborted 1994 film script, with Lance Henriksen being considered for the role. This version would have been Carlton Strand, who acquired his powers years prior while on the run from police after he stole mercury in New Mexico. Over the years, he became a powerful billionaire and attempts to create a "master race" with him as its leader. He and his henchman "Boyd", a man with sand powers, would also try to bribe Spider-Man into joining him, but Strand is killed in battle over the World Trade Center.
 Jamie Foxx portrays Max Dillon / Electro in two Marvel films. This version is an electrical engineer who works for Oscorp, views himself as a nobody, and idolizes Spider-Man after the hero saves him from Aleksei Sytsevich.
 Dillon first appears in the Sony Pictures film The Amazing Spider-Man 2. Foxx revealed that the character was redesigned to be more grounded and that the villain's classic yellow and green suit would be omitted in favor of a modern look. While fixing a power line on his birthday, Dillon is electrocuted and falls into a tank of genetically engineered electric eels, which grant him electrical powers. Surviving the ordeal, a disfigured but drained Dillon heads to Times Square to "charge" himself with more electricity, but is confronted by Spider-Man. Initially excited, a stray shot from an NYPD sniper causes Dillon to believe Spider-Man set him up before attacking him, only to be subdued and sent to Ravencroft for study. Taking the name "Electro", he is broken out by Harry Osborn, who requires his help in breaking into Oscorp to find a cure for his terminal illness. Electro agrees and is given a new suit to control his powers. After they successfully break in, Harry allows Electro to take over the electrical grid he designed and take control of New York's electricity. Magnetizing his web-shooters to protect them from Electro, Spider-Man confronts him once more and repairs the damaged electrical grid so Gwen Stacy can reactivate it; allowing the web-slinger to overload Electro with his own electricity.
 Foxx reprises his role as Dillon in the Marvel Cinematic Universe film Spider-Man: No Way Home, sporting an updated redesign more closely resembling his mainstream comics counterpart. Prior to becoming pure energy, he is transported to another universe and regains his human form after consuming the electricity there, only to be confronted by the native Spider-Man and Sandman from a different universe before they are brought to the New York Sanctum along with other dimensionally-displaced supervillains. The first Spider-Man later breaks the villains out and persuades them to let him cure them and avert their original fates. However, the Green Goblin sabotages the experiment, allowing Electro and the other villains to escape. After gaining power from an Arc Reactor, Electro fights three Spider-Men until Doctor Octopus from Sandman's universe cures him. Dillon laments losing his powers, but his Spider-Man assures him that he is not a nobody and convinces him to abandon his supervillainy before Doctor Strange returns Dillon and the dimensionally-displaced individuals to their respective universes.

Video games
 The Max Dillon incarnation of Electro appears as a boss in Spider-Man: The Video Game, Spider-Man: Mysterio's Menace, Spider-Man: Return of the Sinister Six, and Spider-Man vs. The Kingpin.
 The Max Dillon incarnation of Electro appears in Spider-Man and Captain America in Doctor Doom's Revenge.
 The Max Dillon incarnation of Electro appears in The Amazing Spider-Man 3: Invasion of the Spider-Slayers.
 The Max Dillon incarnation of Electro appears in Spider-Man 2: Enter Electro, voiced by Dee Bradley Baker. He intends to use the "Bio-Nexus Device", a mechanism that can enhance a person's bioelectric field, to become a god. Working with Shocker, Sandman, the Beetle, and Hammerhead, Electro abducts Dr. Watts, the creator of the device, and fights Spider-Man over its possession. Electro eventually uses the device to become a being of pure energy dubbed "Hyper-Electro", but is ultimately de-powered and defeated by Spider-Man and imprisoned.
 The Ultimate Marvel incarnation of Max Dillon / Electro appears as a boss in the Ultimate Spider-Man video game, voiced by James Arnold Taylor.
 The Max Dillon incarnation of Electro appears as a boss in the Game Boy Advance version of Spider-Man 3.
 The Max Dillon incarnation of Electro appears as a boss and playable character in the PSP version of Spider-Man: Friend or Foe, voiced by David Kaye. He is one of many supervillains who Mysterio captures and places under mind control before sending him to an island in the Mediterranean Sea to retrieve a meteor shard. After Spider-Man defeats him and destroys his mind-control device, Electro joins forces with him to exact revenge on Mysterio.
 The Max Dillon incarnation of Electro appears as an assist character in Spider-Man: Web of Shadows, voiced by Liam O'Brien. He goes on a rampage through quarantine camps that S.H.I.E.L.D. established for symbiote-infected people while searching for his sister. After Spider-Man defeats him, Electro is shot by Black Widow, though his infected sister approaches and infects him with her symbiote to heal him. While the symbiote-infected Electro escapes, he reemerges during the symbiotes' invasion before he is defeated by Spider-Man, who frees him from his symbiote's control.
 The Max Dillon incarnation of Electro appears as a boss in most versions of Marvel: Ultimate Alliance 2, voiced by Kirk Thornton.
 The Ultimate Marvel incarnation of Max Dillon / Electro appears as a boss in Spider-Man: Shattered Dimensions, voiced by Thomas F. Wilson. He uses a fragment of the Tablet of Order and Chaos to increase his powers and take over a hydroelectric dam, becoming larger and more powerful as he absorbs more energy. He also gains the ability to create minions to attack Spider-Man, who eventually defeats Electro by tricking him into destroying the dam, shorting him out, while Spider-Man claims his tablet fragment. In the Nintendo DS version, the mainstream version of Max Dillon / Electro appears as a boss for the Amazing Spider-Man.
 The Max Dillon incarnation of Electro appears in Marvel Heroes, voiced again by Liam O'Brien.
 The Max Dillon incarnation of Electro appears in Marvel Super Hero Squad Online, voiced by Steve Blum.
 Both the mainstream and Ultimate Marvel incarnations of Max Dillon / Electro appear as separate playable characters in Lego Marvel Super Heroes, both voiced by David Sobolov.
 The Max Dillon incarnation of Electro appears as a boss in The Amazing Spider-Man 2 film tie-in game, voiced by Michael A. Shepperd in most versions and by Liam O'Brien in the mobile version. Similarly to the film the game is based on, this version is an Oscorp engineer who is rescued by Spider-Man after two rival gangs attack the company. Dillon also helps Spider-Man prevent a potentially catastrophic incident, which causes him to develop an unhealthy attraction towards the hero. After failing to report an Oscorp employee who took credit for his power grid to Donald Menken, Dillon suffers a freak accident that grants him electrical powers. Realizing that Spider-Man will not recognize him in his current state and for fear of being arrested, he becomes the criminal Electro. He is subsequently arrested and sent to Ravencroft, where he becomes one of several test subjects for experiments funded by the Kingpin and overseen by Menken. Dillon eventually escapes and drains the city's power, causing a blackout. When Spider-Man confronts him, Dillon reveals the experiments he was subjected to and blames the web-slinger for not being there to save him. After a battle with Spider-Man, Electro is defeated and his body explodes.
 Various alternate reality versions of Max Dillon / Electro appear as bosses in Spider-Man Unlimited, all voiced again by Christopher Daniel Barnes. They appear as members of a multiversal Sinister Six.
 The Max Dillon incarnation of Electro appears as a playable character in Lego Marvel Super Heroes 2. Additionally, his Marvel 2099 counterpart is also playable and serves as a minor boss in the game's story.
 The Francine Frye incarnation of Electro appears in Marvel Strike Force as a member of the Sinister Six.
 The Max Dillon incarnation of Electro appears as a boss in Marvel's Spider-Man, voiced by Josh Keaton. This version is bald and has star-shaped facial scars. Within the game's continuity, Spider-Man has been a superhero for eight years and is well-familiar with Electro, having fought him several times in the past. Electro is initially imprisoned in the Raft until Otto Octavius stages a prison break and recruits Electro, among others, into his Sinister Six in exchange for Octavius helping him achieve his ultimate goal of becoming a being of pure energy. After the team overpowers Spider-Man, the Sinister Six split up to attack different Oscorp properties, with Electro being sent to cripple the city's power supply. He later joins forces with the Vulture to kill Spider-Man, but both are ultimately defeated and re-incarcerated.
 The Max Dillon incarnation of Electro appears as a boss in Marvel Ultimate Alliance 3: The Black Order, voiced again by Christopher Daniel Barnes. This version is a member of the Sinister Six.
 The Francine Frye incarnation of Electro appears as a playable character in Marvel Puzzle Quest.

Miscellaneous
 The Max Dillon incarnation of Electro in The Amazing Adventures of Spider-Man ride at the Islands of Adventure theme park at Universal Orlando Resort, voiced by Jim Wise. This version is a member of the Sinister Syndicate.
 The Max Dillon incarnation of Electro appears in Spider-Man: Turn Off the Dark, played by actor Emmanuel Brown. This version was originally an Oscorp scientist until the Green Goblin turns him into Electro and manipulates him into joining his Sinister Six.
 The Max Dillon incarnation of Electro appears in the Marvel Universe: LIVE!. This version is a member of the Sinister Six.

References

External links
 Electro at Marvel.com
 The Grand Comics Database 
 
 Electro at Spiderfan.org
 

Action film villains
Black characters in films
Characters created by Stan Lee
Characters created by Steve Ditko
Comics characters introduced in 1964
Fictional businesspeople
Fictional characters from New York (state)
Fictional characters with disfigurements
Fictional characters with electric or magnetic abilities
Fictional murderers
Marvel Comics characters who can move at superhuman speeds
Marvel Comics characters with superhuman strength
Marvel Comics film characters
Marvel Comics male supervillains
Marvel Comics mutates
Marvel Comics supervillains
Spider-Man characters
Video game bosses
Villains in animated television series